Jørgen Bjelke (2 June 1621 – 17 June 1696) was a Norwegian officer and nobleman.  He was born at Elingaard Manor on Onsøy near Fredrikstad, in Østfold County, Norway and died in Kalundborg, Denmark.

Early and personal life
He was the son of Norway’s Reich Chancellor Jens Ågessøn Bjelke and Sophie Brockenhuus. His brothers were Ove and Henrik Bjelke.

He matriculated at the University of Leyden and later at the University of Orléans.

Military career 
He served as a captain in the Hannibal Feud 1644-45. He subsequently saw Danish-Norwegian imperial service in the fighting against the Swedish forces in Germany.

During what is referred to in Norway as "The Bjelke Feud", lieutenant general Bjelke served as the commander-in-chief of the Norwegian army. In August 1658 Charles X of Sweden ignored the recently negotiated Treaty of Roskilde and invested Copenhagen. The Norwegian army mobilized under the leadership of Jørgen Bjelke. Belke's goal was to recapture Trøndelag in the north and to defend the southern Norwegian border at Halden, an areas which Charles X had demanded be turned over to Sweden as it provided both an excellent port for timber export from the newly acquired Bohuslän and a point from which further invasions of Norway could be launched. In September 1658 the new Swedish governor of Bohuslän invaded Norway with 1,500 men and attempted to invest Halden. The inhabitants put up a vigorous defense and the Swedes retreated to Bohuslän.

Gjerset indicates that, "Peder Vibe was commandant of Trondhjem, but the expedition against Sweden in this quarter was to be led by Jørgen Bjelke, probably the ablest officer in the Norwegian army at that moment. His forces numbered 2000 men, who had been recruited primarily in Trøndelagen. With this force he invaded Jaemtland and Herjedalen, drove out the Swedish garrisons, and returned the two provinces once more under Norwegian administration."

Five months later, in February 1659, the Swedes again attacked. Since the first attack, Bjelke had directed the garrison to be strengthened. Under the leadership of Tønne Huitfeldt, the Norwegians again repulsed the Swedish forces. Concurrently, Huitfeldt began construction of fortifications. Cretzenstein, later to be renamed Fredriksten, was the citadel of the fortification system. After each attack on Frederiksten, Bjelke invaded the former Norwegian province of Bohuslän and twice succeeded in reconquering most of it.

Downfall
Bjelke sided with Count Peder Griffenfeld, who fell out of favor with Christian V of Denmark. with Griffenfeld's conviction Bjelke also fell from grace and ended his life in poverty.

References

1696 deaths
1621 births
17th-century Norwegian nobility
Norwegian Army generals
Norwegian people of the Thirty Years' War
People from Fredrikstad
Leiden University alumni
University of Orléans alumni
People from Kalundborg
J